Greisa Martínez Rosas is a Mexican immigrant rights activist based in Dallas. She is executive director of the advocacy organization, United We Dream.

Early life and education 
Martínez Rosas was born in Hidalgo, Mexico to Elia Rosas and Luis Martínez. She has 3 younger sisters. At the age of 8, her family immigrated to the United States and she was subsequently raised in Dallas, Texas. Her father was deported after being found driving without a license. While in high school, Martínez Rosas led student activism efforts such as walkouts to demand justice for undocumented immigrants in the United States. She attended Texas A&M University and, as a freshman, founded the first undocumented student group on campus.

Activism 
Martínez Rosas is an immigrant rights and community activist. She led grassroots efforts and worked for the National Leadership Committee for the Council for Minority Student Affairs as a civic engagement field manager. In 2012, she joined United We Dream (UWD), an immigrant advocacy organization. She later became the deputy executive director of UWD before becoming executive director in August 2020. Martínez Rosas advocates for Deferred Action for Childhood Arrivals (DACA) and opposes the immigration policy of Donald Trump.

Personal life 
Martínez Rosas is queer. She is a DACA recipient and possesses a work permit. In 2018, her mother died of non-Hodgkin lymphoma.

Awards and honors 
In 2020, Martínez Rosas and activist Cristina Jiménez Moreta received Dignity, Community and Power Awards from the Make the Road New York.

References

External links 

 
 

Living people
Year of birth missing (living people)
Immigrant rights activists
People from Hidalgo (state)
Mexican emigrants to the United States
DACA recipients
Mexican women activists
Activists from Texas
People from Dallas
Texas A&M University alumni
Mexican LGBT people
LGBT people from Texas
Queer women